Aramco Financial Services Company (AFSC) is a wholly owned subsidiary of Saudi Refining, Inc., and ultimately of Aramco Services Company.

AFSC serves as the financial guarantor for the Certificates of Financial Responsibility issued by the U.S. Coast Guard to the tanker fleet owned and operated by Vela International Marine, Ltd. This service guarantees the financial liability obligations of the Vela fleet under the Oil Pollution Act of 1990, and ensures the ability of Vela-owned tankers to deliver crude shipments to U.S. ports.

See also 

 Saudi Aramco

References

Saudi Aramco